Desmond McNamara (1938–2022) was an English actor on the stage, radio, TV and film.

McNamara was born in Hackney, east London, to Arthur and Winifred McNamara, and did his National Service in the RAF before becoming a printer.  In 1961 he married Pam Bentley, and they had two sons.

From 1966 he trained at RADA before joining Birmingham Repertory Company, then the Young Vic in 1970, then the Royal National Theatre, followed by an extensive theatre career ranging from the lead in Oliver Goldsmith's The Good Natured Man at the Old Vic in 1971  to the part of Merlin in Camelot in 1996.

Films included The Great Paper Chase (1986), Staggered (1994), Shakespeare in Love (1998) and Lucky Break (2001).

TV appearances included Hazell, The Bill, The Adventures of Sherlock Holmes, Fortunes of War, Roll Over Beethoven, and All at No 20.

Filmography

Film

Television

References 

1938 births
2022 deaths
English actors
People from Hackney, London